1437 Diomedes  is a large Jupiter trojan from the Greek camp, approximately  in diameter. It was discovered on 3 August 1937, by astronomer Karl Reinmuth at the Heidelberg-Königstuhl State Observatory in southwest Germany. The dark D/P-type asteroid belongs to the largest Jupiter trojans and has a notably elongated shape and a longer than average rotation period of 24.49 hours. Diomedes was the first Jupiter trojan successfully observed during an occultation event of star. It was named after the hero Diomedes from Greek mythology.

Orbit and classification 

Diomedes is a dark Jovian asteroid orbiting in the leading Greek camp at Jupiter's  Lagrangian point, 60° ahead of the Gas Giant's orbit in a 1:1 resonance . It is also a non-family asteroid in the Jovian background population. Jupiter trojans are thought to have been captured into their orbits during or shortly after the early stages of the formation of the Solar System. More than 4,500 Jupiter trojans in the Greek camp have already been discovered.

It orbits the Sun at a distance of 5.0–5.4 AU once every 11 years and 10 months (4,329 days; semi-major axis of 5.2 AU). Its orbit has an eccentricity of 0.04 and an inclination of 20° with respect to the ecliptic. The body's observation arc begins at Heidelberg with its official discovery observation in August 1937.

Physical characteristics 

In the Tholen classification, Diomedes has an ambiguous spectral type, closest to the dark D-type asteroids and somewhat similar to the primitive P-type asteroids. Its V–I color index of 0.810 is also lower than that measured for most D-type Jupiter trojans (0.95).

Rotation period 

Several rotational lightcurves of Diomedes have been obtained from photometric observations since the 1960s. The so-far best-rated photometric observations by Robert Stephens at the Goat Mountain Astronomical Research Station  and Santana Observatory  in November 2008, gave a longer-than average rotation period of  hours with a brightness variation of 0.34 magnitude.

Diameter and albedo 

In the 1970s, radiometric observations were published in the Tucson Revised Index of Asteroid Data (TRIAD) compilation gave a diameter of 173.0 kilometers with a radiometric albedo 0.021.

According to the space-based surveys carried out by the Infrared Astronomical Satellite IRAS, the Japanese Akari satellite and the NEOWISE mission of NASA's Wide-field Infrared Survey Explorer, Diomedes measures between 117.786 and 172.60 kilometers in diameter and its surface has an albedo between 0.028 and 0.061. The Collaborative Asteroid Lightcurve Link adopts the results obtained by IRAS, that is, an albedo of 0.0313 and a diameter of 164.31 kilometers based on an absolute magnitude of 8.30. The Collaborative Asteroid Lightcurve Link adopts the results obtained by IRAS, that is, an albedo of 0.0313 and a diameter of 164.31 kilometers based on an absolute magnitude of 8.30.

Diomedes is the third largest Jupiter trojan according to IRAS and Akari, and the 9th largest based on NEOWISE data:

Occultation and shape 

Diomedes was the first Jupiter trojan that was successfully observed during an asteroid occultation, when it occulted the star HIP 014402A over Japan on 7 November 1997. The silhouette was elongated with a major and minor occultation axis of  kilometers (poor fit). The ellipsoid dimensions of  kilometers – corresponding to a mean-diameter of 132.5 kilometers, equivalent to the volume of a sphere – were estimated using follow-up photometry at Ondřejov Observatory and Mitaka Observatory  that determined the body's rotational phase at the exact time of the occultation event.

Naming 

This minor planet was named from Greek mythology after the hero Diomedes, King of Argos and known for his participation in the Trojan War, regarded as the best warriors of the Achaeans, just behind Achilles and alongside Ajax. The official naming citation was mentioned in The Names of the Minor Planets by Paul Herget in 1955.

References

External links 
 Asteroid Lightcurve Database (LCDB), query form (info )
 Dictionary of Minor Planet Names, Google books
 Discovery Circumstances: Numbered Minor Planets (1)-(5000) – Minor Planet Center
 
 

001437
Discoveries by Karl Wilhelm Reinmuth
Named minor planets
001437
19370803